Carlos Barrionuevo (29 December 1977 – 30 August 2015) was an Argentine footballer who appeared for Atlético Roma of Italy. He played as an attacking midfielder. In 2015, Barrionuevo died in a fishing accident.

References

External links
 Profile at BDFA 

1977 births
2015 deaths
Argentine footballers
Argentine expatriate footballers
Club Alianza Lima footballers
Danubio F.C. players
Ferro Carril Oeste footballers
F.C. Penafiel players
Atletico Roma F.C. players
U.S. Salernitana 1919 players
Primeira Liga players
Serie B players
Expatriate footballers in Italy
Expatriate footballers in Peru
Expatriate footballers in Portugal
Expatriate footballers in Uruguay
Association football midfielders
Argentine expatriate sportspeople in Italy
Argentine expatriate sportspeople in Peru
Argentine expatriate sportspeople in Portugal
Argentine expatriate sportspeople in Uruguay
Boating accident deaths
Accidental deaths in Iran
2010s missing person cases
Missing person cases in Argentina
Footballers from Santa Fe, Argentina